Ware County High School is the only public high school in Ware County, Georgia, United States.  It is located in the city of Waycross.

History 
Ware County High School was formed in 1958 by the merging of Waresboro High School and Wacona High Schools. Expansion occurred in 1993 when the Waycross City Schools dropped their charter and Waycross High was absorbed by Ware County Senior High. In 1994, the doors were opened to a new high school in Ware County. It is located on Victory Drive, and is home to more than 1500 students and 110 faculty members. Dr. Paul Callahan was named the new principal in 2019. In January 2021, Tony Nazworth replaced Callahan to be an Interim Principal, but was later fired due to his relationship with one of the teachers. As of August 2021, Dr. Tyrone Buford Kellogg replace Nazworth as the new principal of the high school.

Extracurricular activities 

 Academic Quiz Bowl Team
 Alpha Delta Science Club
 Anchor Club
 BETA Club/National Honor Society 
 Chorus (Advanced, Women's, Mixed, and Acappella)
 Drama (One-Act Play and Musical Theatre) 
 Envirothon
 FBLA
 FCCLA
 FEA (Future Educators of America)
 FFA
 HOSA
 Jazz Band
 Journalism Team
 JROTC
 Leadership Team
 Marching Band - with Majorettes, Flag Line, and Dance Team
 Model UN
 Mock Trial
 Student Council
 TSA (Technology Students' Association)
 Yearbook Staff

Sports offered

 Baseball
 Basketball
 Competitive cheerleading
 Cross country
 Drill team
 Football
 Golf
 Raiders (dissolved for the 2020–2021 school year - reinstated 2021–2022 school year)
 Rifle
 Soccer
 Softball
 Swimming
 Tennis
 Track
 Volleyball
 Wrestling

Sports history 
The Ware County Gators high school football team made it to the state AAAA championship game during the 2007 season and the AAAAA championship game during the 2012 season. The Gators lost 20–14 to Northside Warner Robins High School Eagles in 2007 and lost 49–13 to the Gainesville High School Red Elephants in 2012. They challenged Charlie Grisham's Carrollton Trojans for the 1961 A championship, but lost 21–0. It was a rare weekend in that their cross-town rivals, the Waycross Bulldogs, had won the AA State Championship the night before, defeating Rossville 23–7.
Head coach Jason Strickland lead the Gators to a GHSA Class 5A state championship in 2022 over the Warner Robins Demons 38-13.

The Gators play at Memorial Stadium.

State titles
Girls' Basketball (1) - 1964 (2A) 
Girls' Golf (1) - 2015(5A), 2022(5A) 
Riflery (5) - 1997 (Open), 2017 (Open), 2018 (Open), 2019 (Open), 2022 (Open) 
Football (1) - 2022(5A)

Army program
The school's Army JROTC program is run by SFC Rena Rivere and CW2 Johnson

Notable alumni
Leodis McKelvin - former professional football player
Ernest Jones - professional football player
Joshua Rouse, retired actor, known for playing Jerry Ford in movie, The Sim Racer

References

Public high schools in Georgia (U.S. state)
Schools in Ware County, Georgia